Solid surface is a man-made material usually composed of a combination of alumina trihydrate (ATH), acrylic, epoxy or polyester resins and pigments.  It is most frequently used for seamless countertop installations.

 

Solid surface was first introduced by DuPont in 1967 under the name of Corian. Since the expiration of their patent other manufacturers have entered the market with their own branded products.

Performance characteristics
Solid surface is a non-porous low-maintenance material used for surfaces such as countertops. It can mimic the appearance of granite, marble, stone, and other naturally occurring materials, and can be joined nearly  invisibly by a trained craftsman. Typically manufactured in sheet form for fabrication into finished countertops, solid surface can also be cast into a variety of shapes, including sinks, shower pans and bathtubs. Sheet goods can also be heated and bent into three-dimensional shapes using a process called thermoforming, which adds to the versatility of the product. Color and design flexibility are key factors when choosing engineered composites over natural stone.

In a residential setting, solid surface can be used as kitchen countertops, bathroom vanity tops, and shower and tub surrounds. Countertop fabricators typically join solid surface sheets into desired shapes using a two-part adhesive, after which the cured joint is machined flat. The same method is used to build up edge thickness, which can be profiled using tools and techniques similar to those used to work hardwoods.

A major appeal of solid surface is its impermeability. Solid surface sinks can be joined to the countertop surface with no gaps, which eliminates areas for water to collect and bacteria to grow. Integral backsplashes can also be created that follow the contours of the wall “seamlessly” and without gaps.

Should the material become scratched or broken, solid surface can, in most cases, be repaired quickly by a certified solid surface repair company or trained fabricator. Cracked sinks can be replaced as well.  Because the surface is solid throughout, a countertop that has undergone years of wear and tear can be refinished. The installed product is available in a variety of finishes, ranging from matte to high-gloss, although most manufacturers recommend a matte or satin finish for ease of maintenance.

Availability
Solid surface is available in hundreds of colors and visual textures, ranging from solid colors to sparkling, marbleized, or granite effect. Dozens of multinational companies manufacture solid surface sheet goods and sinks for the world market; and hundreds of smaller, regional manufacturers produce for local markets.

Although solid surface faces competition from natural stone and engineered stone/quartz surfacing, the material is popular in Asia, particularly in residential new construction. An emerging market for solid surface is in commercial and industrial settings, where its non-porous characteristics, combined with durability, renewability and formability make it the material of choice for many designers and architects. Also appealing, is the wide range of colors and textures, as well as the ability to custom-color the material for large projects. Hospitals, in particular, employ large amounts of solid surface for sinks, showers, nursing stations and wall cladding, because its seamless properties eliminate gaps and crevices that harbor harmful bacteria.

Manufacture 
Solid surface is manufactured by mixing acrylic, epoxide or polyester resin with powdered bauxite filler and pigments. The material chemically cures and is heated to 60 °C or more. Cured material is then cut in sheets or shapes and sanded on one or both sides depending the brand used. Sometimes the material is brought to 160 °C and cooled, to improve its heat resistance.

Acrylic-modified polyester solid surface can be mixed one sheet at a time using different formulations, effects and appearances. Acrylic-modified polyester solid surface can be injected into molds to produce various solid decorative design figures.

Solid-surface manufacturing companies may be members of the trade organizations American Composites Manufacturers Association, ISFA (International Surface Fabricators Association, and ICPA (International Cast Polymer Association). These organizations identify the product under the "brand" of MasterCast Engineered Composites.

Solid surface can also be moulded using dedicated moulds. For example free standing baths are manufactured using a two-part mould tool which creates a cavity for the material to be poured into. Once the mould has been prepared for casting, the material is mixed and degassed in an automated casting machine. It is then injected into the cavity of the mould. Many finishes are available including, gel coated, matte, gloss, metallic and textured.

Fabrication
A surface fabricator shapes and installs functional and decorative surfaces, usually in buildings.  Surface fabrication, as a distinct professional enterprise, usually involves complex tasks of surface shaping. A leading case is countertop fabrication.

Materials
For interior spaces, surfaces include solid coverings or decking for floors or walls, and countertops for kitchens, bathrooms, and workspaces. Natural surfaces are composed of naturally occurring materials like wood, stone, mineral, metals, clay, gum and resin. Synthetic surfaces contain, in addition to any natural materials, man-made substances such as metal alloys or polymers. Solid surfaces are synthetic surfaces manufactured from polymeric materials.

Tools 
Tools of surface fabrication include routers, drills, templates, clamps, ovens, suction cup grips, and table saws. Larger surface fabricators may also use CNC routers.  For all but the simplest jobs, surface fabrication usually takes place in the workshop, after which the finished product is assembled and installed at the work site. Installation of multi-part surfaces, such as "L" and "U" shaped countertops, often involves complex work with specialized tools, to create a seamless result.

Applications
Solid surfaces is used in the following environment:
Kitchen/Bathroom: kitchen countertops with integrated sink, vanity tops with sink(s), shower, etc.
Hospitality/Catering: bars, tables, reception desks, etc.
Shop Fitting: displays, counters, wall cladding, etc.
Airports: check-in counters, etc.
Public buildings: displays in museums, facades, meeting tables, etc.
Hospitals: laboratory countertops, decontamination sinks, endoscopy, etc.

Solid surface is priced to compete with natural stone or quartz surfacing. It is available in  many colors and  patterns.  The material can be formed to shape, which makes it  appealing to commercial and industrial designers. Specialist fabricators possess the skills and knowledge necessary to provide advice and customer service.

Certain high-heat applications (anything above 400 F /200 C) are discouraged, due to the danger of cracking. Because scratches in solid surface appear white to the human eye, most dark colors are not recommended for high use areas.

Related materials
Engineered stone uses quartz powder and pigments and generally requires different tools from those used with solid surface materials.
Epoxy granite

See also
Engineered stone
Paper composite panels

References

Materials
Kitchen countertops